Karmia is a kibbutz in southern Israel. Located between Ashkelon and the Gaza Strip, it falls under the jurisdiction of Hof Ashkelon Regional Council.

History
Kibbutz Karmia was established on 20 May 1950 by a Nahal gar'in of Hashomer Hatzair members from France and Tunisia who had been trained in Beit Zera. It was established on the land the Palestinian village of Hiribya, which was depopulated during the 1948 Arab–Israeli War. Its name is derived from the Hebrew for vineyard (Kerem), which were common in the area.

In 1972 a blanket factory was established in the kibbutz.

The kibbutz absorbed 54 families from Elei Sinai and Nisanit, which were evacuated as part of the disengagement plan. Since 2006 it has been repeatedly hit by Qassam rockets fired from the Gaza Strip, including one that landed on its football pitch, and another Qassam rocket that landed inside a house and injured 3 people severely in 2005.

References

Kibbutzim
Kibbutz Movement
Nahal settlements
Populated places established in 1950
Gaza envelope
Populated places in Southern District (Israel)
1950 establishments in Israel
French-Jewish culture in Israel
Tunisian-Jewish culture in Israel